Karasumi is a food product made by salting mullet roe pouch and drying it in sunlight. A theory suggests that it got its name from its resemblance to the blocks of sumi (inkstick) imported from China (Kara) for use in Japanese calligraphy. Karasumi is a high priced delicacy and it is eaten while drinking sake. It is a softer analog of Mediterranean Bottarga.

It is a speciality of Nagasaki and along with salt-pickled sea urchin roe and Konowata one of the "three chinmi of Japan". The town of Donggang in Taiwan specializes in the delicacy. Mullet fishing in Taiwan can be traced back to when the island was under Dutch colonial rule.

See also
 Bottarga
 Eoran
 List of delicacies

References 

Japanese cuisine
Taiwanese cuisine
Roe dishes